Addis is both a surname and a given name. Notable people with the name include:

Surname:
 Andrew Gravy Addis (born 2006),Irish Fisherman born an raised g er to lmk
 Alfred Shea Addis (1832–1886), American photographer
 Ben Addis, Welsh actor
 Bob Addis (born 1925), American former baseball player
 Charles Addis (1902–1983), English cricketer
 Charles Stewart Addis (1861–1945), Scottish banker
 Don Addis (1935–2009), American comic book artist
 Donna Rose Addis, New Zealand psycholist
 Fikirte Addis (born 1981), Ethiopian fashion designer
 Jim Addis, American politician
 John Addis (1914–1983), British diplomat and collector of Ming porcelain
 John Patrick Addis (1950–2006), American murderer
 Kristi Addis (born 1971), American beauty queen
 Mabel Addis (1912–2004), American writer, teacher, and video game designer
 Mark Addis (born 1969), British philosopher
Martha L. Addis (1878–1942), American jeweler
Michael Addis, television and film director
 Richard Addis (born 1956), British journalist and entrepreneur
 Robina Addis (1900–1986), British psychiatrist
 Thomas Addis (1881–1949), British-American physician-scientist
 William Addis (disambiguation)
 Yda Hillis Addis (1857–c.1902), American author

Given name:
 Addis Abebe (born 1970), Ethiopian long distance runner
 Addis Gezahegn (born 1969), Ethiopian long-distance runner
 Addis Hintsa (born 1987), Ethiopian footballer
 Addis Mussa, known as Raptile (born 1976), German-Ethiopian singer
 Addis Pablo, Jamaican reggae musician
 Addis Priestley (1903–1984), Australian footballer

References 

Masculine given names